Tufanganj subdivision is a subdivision of the Cooch Behar district in the state of West Bengal, India.

Subdivisions
Cooch Behar district is divided into the following administrative subdivisions:

Administrative units
Tufanganj subdivision has 2 police stations, 2 community development blocks, 2 panchayat samitis, 25 gram panchayats, 127 mouzas, 125 inhabited villages, 1 municipality and 2 census towns. The municipality is: Tufanganj. The census towns are: Kamat Phulbari (P) and Chhota Laukuthi.  The subdivision has its headquarters at Tufanganj.

Police stations
Police stations in the Tufanganj subdivision have the following features and jurisdiction:

Blocks
Community development blocks in the Tufanganj subdivision are:

Gram Panchayats
The subdivision contains 25 gram panchayats under 2 community development blocks:

 Tufanganj I block consists of 14 gram panchayats, viz. Andaran–Fulbari–I, Balabhut, Dhalpal–I, Natabari–I, Andaran–Fulbari–II, Chilkhana–I, Dhalpal–II, Natabari–II, Balarampur–I, Chilkhana–II, Maruganj, Balarampur–II, Deocharai and Nakkatigachh.

 Tufanganj II block consists of 11 gram panchayats, viz. Barokodali–I, Bhanukumari–II, Mahiskuchi–II, Salbari–I, Barokodali–II, Falimari, Rampur–I, Salbari–II, Bhanukumari–I, Mahiskuchi–I and Rampur–II.

Education
Given in the table below (data in numbers) is a comprehensive picture of the education scenario in Cooch Behar district, with data for the year 2012-13.

Note: Primary schools include junior basic schools; middle schools, high schools and higher secondary schools include madrasahs; technical schools include junior technical schools, junior government polytechnics, industrial technical institutes, industrial training centres, nursing training institutes etc.; technical and professional colleges include engineering colleges, medical colleges, para-medical institutes, management colleges, teachers training and nursing training colleges, law colleges, art colleges, music colleges etc. Special and non-formal education centres include sishu siksha kendras, madhyamik siksha kendras, centres of Rabindra mukta vidyalaya, recognised Sanskrit tols, institutions for the blind and other handicapped persons, Anganwadi centres, reformatory schools etc.

Educational institutions
The following institutions are located in Tufanganj subdivision:
Tufanganj Mahavidyalaya was established in 1971 at Tufanganj.
Bakshirhat Mahavidyalaya was established in 2005 at Bakshirhat.

Healthcare
The table below (all data in numbers) presents an overview of the medical facilities available and patients treated in the hospitals, health centres and sub-centres in 2013 in Cooch Behar district, with data for the year 2012-13.: 

.* Excluding nursing homes.

Medical facilities
Medical facilities in the Tufanganj subdivision are as follows:

Hospitals: (Name, location, beds) 
Tufanganj Subdivisional Hospital, Tufanganj M, 100 beds
Tufanganj Mental Hospital, Tufanganj

Rural Hospitals: (Name, CD block, location, beds) 
Natabari Rural Hospital, Tufanganj I CD block, Natabari, 30 beds

Block Primary Health Centres: (Name, CD block, location, beds)
Bakshirhat Block Primary Health Centre, Tufanganj II CD block, Bakshirhat, 10 beds

Primary Health Centres : (CD block-wise)(CD block, PHC location, beds)
Tufanganj I CD block: Dewchari (10), Moradanga (10), Balarampur (4)
Tufanganj II CD block: Salbari (4), Rampur (10)

Legislative segments
As per order of the Delimitation Commission in respect of the delimitation of constituencies in the West Bengal, the Tufanganj municipality, Tufanganj–II block and Andaran–Fulbari–I, Balabhut, Dhalpal–I and Nakkatigachh gram panchayats of Tufanganj–I block together will constitute the Tufanganj assembly constituency of West Bengal. The other ten gram panchayats of Tufanganj–I block, viz. Natabari–I, Andaran–Fulbari–II, Chilkhana–I, Dhalpal–II, Natabari–II, Balarampur–I, Chilkhana–II, Maruganj, Balarampur–II and Deocharai will be part of the Natabari assembly constituency. Natabari constituency will be part of Cooch Behar (Lok Sabha constituency), which will be reserved for Scheduled castes (SC) candidates. Tufanganj constituency will be part of Alipurduars (Lok Sabha constituency), which will be reserved for Scheduled tribes (ST) candidates.

References

Subdivisions of West Bengal
Subdivisions in Cooch Behar district
Cooch Behar district